Brightside may refer to:

Places
Brightside, Sheffield, district of Sheffield, South Yorkshire, England
Shiregreen and Brightside, ward in Sheffield
Sheffield Brightside (UK Parliament constituency)
Brightside, California, in Alameda County, U.S.
Brightside, Ontario, a township in eastern Ontario, Canada

Music
Brightside (band), a pop rock band from Tallahassee, Florida, United States
Brightside (Killing Time album), by Killing Time
Brightside (The Lumineers album), by the Lumineers
"Brightside" (The Lumineers song), the title track from the album
Brightside (Viva Saturn album), an album by the American band Viva Saturn
Brightside (EP), by Rich Brian
"Brightside" (Icona Pop song), by Icona Pop
"Mr. Brightside", a song by The Killers

Other uses
Bright Side (YouTube channel), a YouTube channel
Brightside Group, an insurance broking and financial services business
BrightSide Technologies, a display technology company
Emu (II) / Brightside (ferry), a ferry used in Brisbane and Sydney between 1865 and 1908
Samsung Brightside, a cell phone released in 2012